The 1984–85 Roller Hockey Champions Cup was the 19th edition of the Roller Hockey Champions Cup organized by CERH.

Barcelona achieved their ninth title ever.

Teams
The champions of the main European leagues, and Barcelona as title holders, played this competition, consisting in a double-legged knockout tournament.

Bracket

Source:

References

External links
 CERH website

1983 in roller hockey
1984 in roller hockey
Rink Hockey Euroleague